Michael Marketo is an Australian former rugby league footballer who played in the 1980s. He played for Balmain in the New South Wales Rugby League (NSWRL) competition.

Background
Marketo was born in Sydney, New South Wales, Australia.  He is the father of Jake Marketo.

Playing career
A Balmain junior, Marketo made his first grade debut for Balmain against Manly-Warringah in Round 6 1983 at Brookvale Oval.  Marketo scored his first try for Balmain in Round 5 1984 against Penrith.  In 1985, Marketo played 10 games as the club reached the minor semi final against Parramatta but lost the match 32–4.  In 1986, Marketo enjoyed his best season as Balmain reached the preliminary final against Canterbury-Bankstown but the club fell short of a grand final appearance losing the match 28–16.

Marketo played one final season with Balmain in 1987.  His last game in the top grade for the club was in Round 21 1987 against North Sydney at Leichhardt Oval which Balmain won 28–14.

References

1959 births
Living people
Balmain Tigers players
Australian rugby league players
Rugby league players from Sydney
Rugby league second-rows
Rugby league props